William Turner,  D.D. (10 May 1647 – 20 April 1685) was  an English Anglican priest in the 17th century.

Turner was  educated at Trinity College, Oxford. He  was Rector of Stanhope and Archdeacon of Northumberland from 1776 until his death on 10 November 1722.

Notes

18th-century English Anglican priests
Archdeacons of Northumberland
Alumni of Trinity College, Oxford
1647 births
1685 deaths